Colin Graham McKinnon (born 29 August 1969) was a Scottish footballer who played for Falkirk, East Stirlingshire, Arbroath, Dumbarton, Stenhousemuir, Albion Rovers and Stirling Albion.

References

1969 births
Scottish footballers
Dumbarton F.C. players
Falkirk F.C. players
East Stirlingshire F.C. players
Arbroath F.C. players
Stenhousemuir F.C. players
Albion Rovers F.C. players
Stirling Albion F.C. players
Scottish Football League players
Living people
Association football midfielders